Masami Ohinata is a Japanese academic and president of Keisen University in Tokyo.

Biography 
Ohinata specialises in the field of developmental psychology, including child development, the psychology of family relationships and the psychology of women. She also contributes to the work of a non-profit organisation, Ai-Port Station, which provides a free social space for parents and children and a temporary daycare service.

Publications 

 The mystique of motherhood: a key to understanding social change and family problems in Japan in Fujimura-Fanselow, K., & Kameda, A. (1995). Japanese women: New feminist perspectives on the past, present, and future. New York: The Feminist Press at the City University of New York.

References

Living people
Japanese psychologists
Year of birth missing (living people)